Tolomeo e Alessandro, ovvero la corona disprezzata is an Italian-language opera by Domenico Scarlatti to a libretto by Carlo Sigismondo Capece which premiered in Rome on 19 January 1711 at the Palazzo Zuccari, with scenery by Filippo Juvarra. It was second of the seven operas composed by Domenico for the Polish queen Maria Casimira Sobieski, following his pastorale in three acts La Silvia of 27 January 1710.

Recordings
Tolomeo e Alessandro - Ann Hallenberg (Tolomeo), Raffaella  Milanesi (Alessandro), Klara Ek (Seleuce), Roberta Invernizzi (Elisa), Mary-Ellen Nesi (Dorisbe) Theodora Baka (Araspe). Il Complesso Barocco, Alan Curtis, 3 CDs, Fundación Caja Madrid 2010, digital download only DG-Archiv 47640349

References

Operas
1711 operas
Operas by Domenico Scarlatti